The men's 4 × 100 metre freestyle relay event at the 2015 European Games in Baku took place on 23 June at the Aquatic Palace.

Results

Heats
The heats were started at 11:52.

Final
The final was held at 19:42.

References

Men's 4 x 100 metre freestyle relay